Magnolia katiorum is a species of flowering plant in the family Magnoliaceae. It is endemic to Colombia, where it is known from a single location in the Pacific/Chocó natural region. It is a canopy tree of tropical forest habitat. It is known commonly as almanegra de Uraba.

The local habitat is fragmented and degraded, and the tree is harvested for wood.

References

katiorum
Endemic flora of Colombia
Taxonomy articles created by Polbot